Buniadpur Mahavidyalaya is a college in Buniadpur in Dakshin Dinajpur District in North Bengal of West Bengal, India. The college is affiliated to University of Gour Banga,  offering Undergraduate courses.

Departments

Arts

Bengali 
English
History
Political Science
Philosophy
Education

Accreditation
The college is also recognized by the University Grants Commission (UGC).

See also

References

External links
 
University of Gour Banga
University Grants Commission
National Assessment and Accreditation Council

Colleges affiliated to University of Gour Banga
Educational institutions established in 2007
Universities and colleges in Dakshin Dinajpur district
2007 establishments in West Bengal